Fabricio Fabio Fuentes (born 13 October 1976) is an Argentine retired footballer who played as a central defender.

He competed professionally, other than in his country, in France, Mexico and Spain, amassing Primera División totals of 218 games and 18 goals over the course of ten seasons.

Club career
Fuentes was born in Río Cuarto, Córdoba. He began his career playing for Newell's Old Boys in 1996, leaving the following year for Quilmes Atlético Club in the Argentine second division before rejoining Newell's in 1998.

In 2001, Fuentes was signed for his first spell at Club Atlético Vélez Sársfield, on a US$450,000 fee (for 50% of his transfer rights). In January 2003 he was sold to Mexican club Querétaro F.C. for US$1,200,000 but, in the transfer agreement, it was established that the player would stay with Vélez until the end of the season.

However, after a good last months as Vélez's captain, Fuentes' value increased, and he was immediately sold by Querétaro to En Avant Guingamp for US$2,000,000, before having playing any official game in Mexico. After half a season in France he returned to Vélez, helping the team win the league's Clausura in 2005.

Following this success, Fuentes returned to Mexico with F.C. Atlas, but he only stayed one season before moving again, this time to Villarreal CF in Spain, where he re-joined former Vélez teammate Leandro Somoza as well as fellow Argentines Rodolfo Arruabarrena, Mariano Barbosa, Juan Román Riquelme and Gonzalo Rodríguez. During his debut campaign he benefited from a serious knee injury to the latter and scored four times in 33 La Liga games; the following years, however, he returned to the bench, but continued to be used regularly even though he also suffered serious knee problems in January 2008.

On 4 January 2010, Fuentes was released by Villarreal upon the player's request, signing with Atlas and thus returning to the side after three-and-a-half years.

International career
Fuentes played once for Argentina, a friendly against Mexico on 9 March 2005 in which the former only fielded players from the domestic league. He scored in his own net, in an eventual 1–1 draw.

Honours
Vélez
Argentine Primera División: 2005 Clausura

References

External links
 Argentine League statistics at Fútbol XXI 
 
 
 

1976 births
Living people
People from Río Cuarto, Córdoba
Argentine footballers
Association football defenders
Argentine Primera División players
Newell's Old Boys footballers
Quilmes Atlético Club footballers
Club Atlético Vélez Sarsfield footballers
Ligue 1 players
En Avant Guingamp players
Liga MX players
Atlas F.C. footballers
La Liga players
Villarreal CF players
Argentina youth international footballers
Argentina international footballers
Argentine expatriate footballers
Expatriate footballers in France
Expatriate footballers in Mexico
Expatriate footballers in Spain
Argentine expatriate sportspeople in Mexico
Argentine expatriate sportspeople in Spain
Sportspeople from Córdoba Province, Argentina